Beatriz da Conceição (born 21 August 1939 in Porto - 26 November 2015 in Lisbon) was a Portuguese fado singer. Her discography includes performances with António Rocha for Paul Van Nevel with the Huelgas Ensemble. She died at age 76 on 26 November 2015.

References

1939 births
2015 deaths
Portuguese fado singers